Byl jednou jeden dům (Once There Was a House) is a television series first broadcast 1975. It takes place in a house located in fictional Bagounova Street.

Context
The series covers the period from 1936 to 1945, i.e. the period before, during and after the World War II. The series was popular thanks to the constellation of well-known actors, lively dialogues, intertwined stories and fates, but (in the context of normalization) also less ideological burden than was usual at the time. It affects feelings and patriotism, because significant moments such as the Prague uprising or repression during Reinhard Heydrich's tenure and after his assassination also appear in the series.

Cast
Miloš Nedbal as Alexander Nerudný
Vladimír Ráž as Hektor Nerudný called Hekí
Alena Vránová as Klára, Hektor's wife
Josef Bláha as Achilles Nerudný called Aší
Libuše Švormová as Berta, Achilles' wife
Jiří Adamíra as Patrokles Nerudný called Páťa
Josef Abrhám as Paris Nerudný called Párek
Jiří Sovák as Matěj Budák
Vladimír Menšík as Eduard Drvota
Míla Myslíková as Terezie Drvotová
Jiří Hrzán as Tutek Drvota
Zuzana Ondrouchová as Majka Drvotová
František Kovářík as dědeček
Jana Hlaváčová as Anděla Hrachová
Josef Vinklář as Arnošt Ticháček
Jaromír Hanzlík as Martin Hrach
Josef Somr as Josef Soumar
Jaroslava Obermaierová as Růžena Soumarová – Nerudná
Jiří Vala as Dlask
Karel Höger as Vendelín Dalibor Ehrlich
Libuše Havelková as Ehrlich's mistress called Madam
Josef Větrovec as Václav Ulč
Dana Medřická as Ulčová
Eva Hudečková as Pipina Ulčová
Jan Skopeček as Tvaroh
Slávka Budínová as Tvarohová
Václav Postránecký as Přemek Tvaroh
Jan Libíček as Šťovíček
Blažena Holišová as Šťovíčková
František Němec as Walter
Jana Šulcová as Jarmila Klabíková
Marie Rosůlková as French language teacher
Petr Čepek as Adolf Svárovský
Svatopluk Beneš as Benetka
Jaroslava Pokorná as Boženka
Vlastimila Vlková as neighbor

External links
IMDb.com

Czechoslovak television series
Czech drama television series
Czech historical television series
1975 Czechoslovak television series debuts
Czech war television series
Television series about Czech resistance to Nazi occupation
Czechoslovak Television original programming